The 1830 Ohio gubernatorial election was held on October 12, 1830.

Incumbent National Republican Governor Allen Trimble did not run for re-election.

National Republican nominee Duncan McArthur defeated Democratic nominee Robert Lucas.

General election

Candidates
Robert Lucas, Democratic, Speaker of the Ohio Senate
Duncan McArthur, National Republican, former U.S. Representative

Results

References

1830
Ohio
Gubernatorial